The Brunette Odalisque ( or l'Odalisque brune) is an oil-on-canvas painting of  by French artist François Boucher, now in the Louvre in Paris. The painter's signature is engraved on the low table. He later produced two other works in the odalisque genre, both known as The Blonde Odalisque.

References

1745 paintings
Paintings by François Boucher
Nude art
Paintings in the Louvre by French artists